Sir William Moore, 1st Baronet, PC (NI), DL (22 November 1864 – 28 November 1944) was a Unionist member of the British House of Commons from Ireland and a Judge of Ireland, and subsequently of Northern Ireland. He was created a Baronet (of Moore Lodge, Ballymoney, County Antrim, Northern Ireland) in 1932.

Early life and education
Sir William was the eldest son of Queen Victoria's honorary physician in Ireland, Dr. William Moore of Rosnashane, Ballymoney, and Sidney Blanche Fuller. His ancestors came to Ulster during the Plantation, settling at Ballymoney, at which time they were Quakers. The Moore Lodge estate was inherited from a relative; the family owned several other houses: Moore's Grove and Moore's Fort. Sir William Moore's mother was Sidney Blanche Fuller. In 1888 he married Helen Wilson, the daughter of a Deputy Lieutenant of County Armagh. Sir William went on to become a Deputy Lieutenant for County Antrim and a Justice of the Peace.

Sir William was schooled at Marlborough College, then attended Trinity College Dublin, where he was president of the University Philosophical Society. He married Helen Gertrude Wilson (1863-1944) in 1888 and had three children. His eldest son, William (1891-1978), inherited his title on his father's death.

Legal career 
Moore was called to the Irish Bar in 1887, to the English bar in 1899, and became an Irish Queen's Counsel the same year. 

In 1903, Sir William was one of the first landowners of Ireland to sell off their estates under the land acts. By the early 1920s he owned a Belfast pied-à-terre called 'Glassnabreedon' (Moore's public school pronunciation of 'Glas-na-Braden'), in the village of Whitehouse, 4 miles north of Belfast. This house was once owned by the son of Nicholas Grimshaw (1747–1805), Ireland's first cotton pioneer.

He became a member of the General Synod of the Church of Ireland and was a founder member of the Ulster Council. He was a passionate Orangeman: his vehemence in defending Ulster's right to oppose Irish Home Rule is said to have alarmed even those who shared his views. Speaking in England on 10 March 1913 Moore made his feelings clear on the possibility of Irish Home Rule: "I have no doubt, if Home Rule is carried, its baptism in Ireland will be a baptism in blood." He showed little respect for English politicians, and had nothing but contempt for Southern Unionists. The eventual political settlement in 1921 met with his approval.

Political career & death 
Moore was a Member of Parliament, representing North Antrim from 1899 to 1906. From 1903 to 1904, he was an unpaid secretary to the Chief Secretary for Ireland. Having lost his Parliamentary seat in the 1906 general election, Moore was elected for North Armagh at a by-election in November that year. He sat for this seat until he was appointed a judge of Ireland's High Court.

He was a Justice of the Irish High Court from 1917–1921. He was sworn of the Privy Council of Ireland in the 1921 Birthday Honours, entitling him to the style "The Right Honourable".  Following the partition of Ireland, he became a Lord Justice of Appeal in the Northern Irish Court of Appeal (1921–1925). He was sworn of the Privy Council of Northern Ireland in 1922 and became the Lord Chief Justice of Northern Ireland, succeeding Sir Denis Henry – a position he held until 1937.

Moore died at his home, Moore Lodge, in Ballymoney on 28th November 1944, less than a week after his 80th birthday. He was buried in the family burial ground, "Lamb's Fold", two days later.

References

Further reading
Who's Who of British Members of Parliament: Vol. II 1886–1918, edited by M. Stebton and S. Lees (The Harvester Press 1978)

1864 births
1944 deaths
Baronets in the Baronetage of the United Kingdom
Deputy Lieutenants of Antrim
English barristers
Irish barristers
Irish Unionist Party MPs
Members of the Privy Council of Ireland
Members of the Privy Council of Northern Ireland
Members of the Parliament of the United Kingdom for County Antrim constituencies (1801–1922)
Members of the Parliament of the United Kingdom for County Armagh constituencies (1801–1922)
People educated at Marlborough College
Alumni of Trinity College Dublin
Ulster Unionist Party members of the House of Commons of the United Kingdom
UK MPs 1895–1900
UK MPs 1900–1906
UK MPs 1906–1910
UK MPs 1910
UK MPs 1910–1918
Lord chief justices of Northern Ireland
Lords Justice of Appeal of Northern Ireland